The Airdrie–Bathgate rail link is a completed railway project in central Scotland.

Instigated as part of a round of transport improvement projects proposed by the then Scottish Executive in 2003, the plan was to open up a fourth direct railway link between the cities of Glasgow and Edinburgh. The project was completed in October 2010, at an estimated cost of £300 million. The rail link received the final approval of the Scottish Parliament on 28 March 2007, and gained royal assent on 9 May 2007.

Background 
In line with plans to complete the missing part of the M8 motorway, the Executive stipulated that public transport links between Scotland's two largest cities must improve.

It will complement the existing "shuttle" service between Queen Street (High Level) and Edinburgh via , which will remain the primary railway link between the two cities, taking around 50 minutes at peak times.

Benefits and infrastructure improvements 
The line is intended to bring significant benefits to the West Lothian area, connecting it to the Greater Glasgow conurbation.

In order to permit four trains per hour in each direction, improvements to the existing line have been made:

 An upgrade of Newbridge Junction, where the railways from Bathgate and Falkirk to Edinburgh join.
 Electrification of the line between Drumgelloch and Haymarket.

The Class 380s delivered to ScotRail for use across the Strathclyde network. This allowed the Class 334s to be used on the Helensburgh/Milngavie to/from Edinburgh services.

Progress
The start of work was signalled with a sod cutting ceremony at Livingston North station in June 2007, attended by Transport Minister Stewart Stevenson. Contracts worth £300m for design, installation and commissioning of signalling and telecommunications had been awarded by July 2008. Remodelling of Newbridge Junction and doubling of Bathgate branch was completed in October 2008. Blackridge railway station was included as one of the stations to be opened on the line.

On 27 August 2010 at Drumgelloch, a ceremony took place to lay the last piece of track between Airdrie and Bathgate joining the two towns by rail for the first time since 1982.

With work to install overhead line and signalling equipment for the line complete, it was opened for operational use and driver training on 18 October 2010. Passenger services began on 12 December 2010, as an extension of the existing services to Airdrie on the North Clyde Line, incorporated into National Rail timetable 226. Services are currently hourly (half hourly on weekends). Drumgelloch,  and Armadale were initially served by bus substitution services open due to the inclement weather at the end of November 2010 delaying the completion of minor works (including surfacing of car parks).

On 13 February 2011  opened. Armadale opened on 4 March, followed by Drumgelloch on 6 March, thus completing all station work. Effective 7 March, service between Glasgow Queen Street and Edinburgh Waverley increased to two trains per hour on weekdays, Saturdays and Sunday afternoons. On Tuesday 8 March 2011, Scottish Transport Minister Keith Brown officially opened the Airdrie-Bathgate Rail Link.

See also
 Edinburgh to Glasgow Improvement Programme

References

Further reading 
 Glen, A. Airdrie-Bathgate Rail Link – Reconnecting Communities. Ramsey (IOM), Lily Publications, 2010. .

External links 
Official site for the Airdrie–Bathgate railway link

Railway lines in Scotland
Standard gauge railways in Scotland
Airdrie, North Lanarkshire
Transport in North Lanarkshire
Transport in West Lothian
Bathgate